Gilmore is an elevated station on the Millennium Line of Metro Vancouver's SkyTrain rapid transit system. The station is located on Gilmore Avenue in Burnaby, British Columbia, Canada.

The station is adjacent to several high-rise condominium complexes which are a component of the Brentwood Town Centre Development Plan, which drives the transformation of the area from a light industrial and lower-occupancy commercial zone into an urbanized centre.

Structure and design

Gilmore station, completed in 2002 as part of the original Millennium Line, is elevated with two platforms on either side of the SkyTrain tracks. The station was designed by Busby and Associates who also designed Brentwood Town Centre station. Dominion Construction built the Gilmore station as part of a $14.3-million contract that also included Brentwood Town Centre station and the Gilmore power substation.

As the station was expected to be incorporated into a new commercial complex, the wood and metal frames were designed to be easily disassembled and then reconfigured, maintaining the artistic intention of the station and accommodating any future alterations to the SkyTrain line or development around it.

Station information

Station layout

Entrances
Gilmore station is served by a single entrance located at the southwest end of the station at the northeast corner of Gilmore Avenue and Dawson Street.

Transit connections

Gilmore station provides connections within Burnaby and the District of North Vancouver. The following bus routes serve the station:

References

External links

Millennium Line stations
Railway stations in Canada opened in 2002
Buildings and structures in Burnaby
2002 establishments in British Columbia